2-Vinyl-4,6-diamino-1,3,5-triazine is an organic compound with the formula (H2NC)2N3CCH=CH2.  The molecule consists of a vinyl group (-CH=CH2) attached to a 2,4-diaminotriazine.  A colorless solid, it is a monomeric precursor to polymers with hydrogen-bonding substituents.

Reference

Triazines